Carinaria is a genus of medium-sized floating sea snails, pelagic gastropod molluscs in the family Carinariidae.

Anatomy 
The cylindrical and elongate body consists of three parts : a short proboscis, a well-developed trunk and tail region of variable size. The size of this tail goes from very small in Carinaria galea to very large in Carinaria cristata. The well-developed swimming fin is located in both sexes at the back of the trunk and has at its back margin a small fin sucker. The right tentacle is small or vestigial. The cuticle is thick and gelatinous. The shells are known as “Venus slippers.”

Species
The World Register of Marine Species includes the following species within the genus Carinaria:

 Carinaria cithara Benson, 1835 – harp carinaria
 Carinaria cristata (Linnaeus, 1767) – Indo-Pacific
 Carinaria galea Benson, 1835 – helmet carinaria; Indo-Pacific
 Carinaria japonica Okutani, 1955 – Japan, North Pacific
 Carinaria lamarckii Blainville, 1817
 Carinaria pseudorugosa Vayssière, 1904 
Species brought into synonymy:
 Carinaria atlantica Adams & Reeve, 1850: synonym of Carinaria lamarckii Blainville, 1817
 Carinaria australis Quoy & Gaimard, 1833: synonym of Carinaria lamarckii Blainville, 1817
 Carinaria challengeri Bonnevie, 1920: synonym of Carinaria pseudorugosa Vayssière, 1904
 Carinaria grimaldii Vayssière, 1904: synonym of Carinaria lamarckii Blainville, 1817
 Carinaria lamarcki Péron & Lesueur, 1810: synonym of Carinaria lamarckii Blainville, 1817
 Carinaria mediterranea Blainville, 1825: synonym of Carinaria lamarckii Blainville, 1817
 Carinaria punctata d'Orbigny, 1836: synonym of Carinaria lamarckii Blainville, 1817

References

Further reading 
 Seapy, Roger R. 2008. Carinaria Lamarck 1801. Version 12 July 2008, Tree of Life Web Project: Carinaria
 
 Powell A. W. B., New Zealand Mollusca, William Collins Publishers Ltd, Auckland, New Zealand 1979 
 Bonnevie, K. 1920. Heteropoda collected during the "Michael Sars" North Atlantic Deep-Sea Expedition 1910 Report on the Scientific Results of the "Michael Sars" North Atlantic Deep Sea Expedition 1910 3(2) 1–16, pls. 1–5. [True date: 28 Feb 1920.]
  Malacolog Version 4.1.0 :  A Database of Western Atlantic Marine Mollusca

Carinariidae
Gastropod genera
Taxa named by Jean-Baptiste Lamarck